Biatora kalbii is a species of squamulose lichen in the family Ramalinaceae. It has a pantropical distribution.

Taxonomy
The species was first formally described by Brazilian lichenologist Lois Brako in her 1991 monograph on the genus Biatora. The type specimen was collected in 1980 from Mato Grosso do Sul by Klaus Kalb, for whom the species in named. Sergey Kondratyuk transferred the species from genus Phyllopsora to Biatora in 2019.

Description
The thallus of Biatora kalbii is made of small round to elongated, convex green squamules (scales) measuring 0.1–0.3 mm in diameter. Some scales are arranged so that they are discrete, while others may overlap; all are attached closely to the substrate. Isidia are spherical; they lengthen by budding. The prothallus is pale and thin. Apothecia (sexual reproductive structures) are common in Biatora kalbii; they are circular with a pale to dark brown disc that is either flat or slightly convex, and a margin around the disc. The ascospores are ellipsoid to short-fusiform (tapering on both ends). Pycnidia are common on the lichen surface; they appear tan-coloured spots with orange to brown ostioles immersed in the thallus. The pycnidia produce straight, rod-shaped conidia that measure 9 by 1 μm. The lichen does not produce any secondary chemicals that could be detected with standard spot tests.

Distribution
Brako's original description includes records from the United States, Dominican Republic, Brazil, Kenya, and Tanzania.

References

kalbii
Lichen species
Lichens described in 1991
Lichens of Africa
Lichens of the Caribbean
Lichens of the United States
Lichens of Brazil
Fungi without expected TNC conservation status